Qeshlaq-e Hezarat Qoli Bakhtiar (also Romanized as Qeshlāq-e Ḩez̤arat Qolī Bakhtīār) is a village in Qeshlaq-e Jonubi Rural District, Qeshlaq Dasht District, Bileh Savar County, Ardabil Province, Iran. At the 2006 census, its population was 57, in 12 families.

References 

Towns and villages in Bileh Savar County